Juliusz Władysław Sieradzki (23 February 1912 – 30 November 1999) was a Polish sailor. He competed in the mixed 6 metres in the 1936 Summer Olympics.

References

1912 births
1999 deaths
Sportspeople from Lviv
People from the Kingdom of Galicia and Lodomeria
Polish Austro-Hungarians
Polish male sailors (sport)
Olympic sailors of Poland
Sailors at the 1936 Summer Olympics – 6 Metre